"Can I Get Open" is a song by American hip hop group Original Flavor. It was released in 1993 as the first single from their second album Beyond Flavor. The song features a then unknown Jay-Z and was produced by Ski.

References

1993 songs
American hip hop songs
Jay-Z songs